Austrophorocera is a genus of flies in the family Tachinidae.

Species
A. alba (Townsend, 1917)
A. biserialis (Macquart, 1847)
A. cocciphila (Aldrich & Webber, 1924)
A. coccyx (Aldrich & Webber, 1924)
A. decedens (Walker, 1860)
A. einaris (Smith, 1912)
A. grandis (Macquart, 1851)
A. heros (Schiner, 1868)
A. hirsuta (Mesnil, 1946)
A. imitator (Aldrich & Webber, 1924)
A. isabeli (Baranov, 1938)
A. longiuscula (Walker, 1857)
A. meridionalis (Thompson, 1968)
A. minor (Thompson, 1968)
A. pellecta (Reinhard, 1957)
A. stolida (Reinhard, 1957)
A. sulcata (Aldrich & Webber, 1924)
A. tuxedo (Curran, 1930)
A. virilis (Aldrich & Webber, 1924)
A. yahuarphrynoides (Townsend, 1927)

References

Diptera of North America
Exoristinae
Tachinidae genera
Taxa named by Charles Henry Tyler Townsend